Heino Anto (also Hindrik Anto; 13 October 1882 Torgu Parish (now Saaremaa Parish), Kreis Ösel – 13 September 1955 Tallinn) was an Estonian politician, stage actor, playwright, theatre director, and journalist. He was a member of the II Riigikogu, representing the National Liberal Party. He was a member of the Riigikogu since 5 June 1925. He replaced Peeter Lindau.

References

1882 births
1955 deaths
People from Saaremaa Parish
People from Kreis Ösel
National Liberal Party (Estonia) politicians
Members of the Riigikogu, 1923–1926
Estonian theatre directors
Estonian male stage actors
Estonian dramatists and playwrights
20th-century Estonian male actors
Estonian journalists
Burials at Rahumäe Cemetery